Family Foreman is an American reality television series starring former heavyweight boxing champion and "grillionaire" George Foreman and his family. The show premiered on TV Land on July 16, 2008, airing a total of six episodes produced by New Line Television. It is the last new series to be produced by New Line Television before it was folded into Warner Bros. Television.

Synopsis
The series follows George Foreman and his family in their day-to-day lives.

Episodes

References

External links
Family Foreman at TVLand.com

2008 American television series debuts
2008 American television series endings
2000s American reality television series
English-language television shows
TV Land original programming
Television series by New Line Television